Worrigee is a suburb of Nowra in the City of Shoalhaven in New South Wales, Australia. It lies southeast of Nowra.

References

City of Shoalhaven